"Regarde-moi (teste-moi, déteste-moi)" is a song recorded by French singer Priscilla Betti. It was released on December 9, 2002 in France and in January 2003 in Belgium and Switzerland as the first single from her second album Priscilla. The single reached the top ten in France and Belgium. In France it was certified Gold for selling over 250,000 copies, and it remains her best-selling single to date.

Lyrics and music video
The song was written by Bertrand Châtenet, and the music was composed and arranged by Philippe Osman. Jérôme Devoise participated in the mixing of the song, with Bertrand Châtenet (both had worked with Mylène Farmer in the 1980s). Background vocals are performed by Priscilla.

In the song, Priscilla says that she likes to make herself conspicuous and that for this she does not hesitate to do something unusual. The music video shows Priscilla accompanied by a female friend in a fast-food restaurant, where she knocks over a young boy on a skateboard during the first verse, then a waitress during the second verse. When she sings the refrain, she performs a choreography with other girls.

The song is included on many French compilations, such as Girls 2003, Non Stop Hits 5. and Generation Hits. On 28 December 2011, Priscilla performed a slow version on her song on the show Les annees 2000 : le retour !, broadcast on M6.

Chart performances
In France, the single charted for 29 weeks on the French Singles Chart (top 100), 23 of them in the top 50. It debuted at number 62 on 7 December 2002 and climbed regularly until reaching number five in its tenth week and stayed for six weeks in the top ten. It was certified Gold disc by the SNEP and was ranked number 23 on End of the Year Chart.

In Belgium (Wallonia), the single entered the chart on January 11, 2003 at number 40, reached number nine five weeks later, where it stayed for two weeks and totalled 11 weeks on the chart. It was 53rd on the Annual Chart.

In Switzerland, the single marked the first appearance of Priscilla on the Swiss Singles Chart. It was furtively ranked at number 81 on 26 January 2003.

Track listing
 CD single

 Digital download

Personnel
 Lyrics by Bertrand Châtenet
 Music by Philippe Osman
 Arrangement, programmation and all instruments by Philippe Osman
 Mixing by Bertrand Châtenet and Jérôme Devoise
 Mastered by André Perriat at Top Master studio
 Vocals by Priscilla
 Produced by B.Châtenet, P.Osman and P.Debort

Charts and sales

Peak positions

Year-end charts

Certifications

References

2002 songs
2003 singles
Priscilla Betti songs
Jive Records singles
Songs written by Philippe Osman
Songs written by Bertrand Châtenet